McKelvy is a surname. Notable people with the surname include:

Frank R. McKelvy (1914–1980), American set decorator
Russ McKelvy (1854–1915), American baseball player
William N. McKelvy Sr. (1869–1933), United States Marine Corps officer

See also
Miesha McKelvy-Jones (born 1976), American hurdler